The iPad Mini (branded and marketed as iPad mini) is a line of mini tablet computers designed, developed, and marketed by Apple Inc. It is a sub-series of the iPad line of tablets, with screen sizes of 7.9 inches and 8.3 inches. The first-generation iPad Mini was announced on October 23, 2012, and was released on November 2, 2012, in nearly all of Apple's markets. It featured similar internal specifications to the iPad 2, including its display resolution.

The iPad Mini 2, with a A7 processor and a Retina Display, was announced on October 22, 2013, and released on November 12, 2013. The iPad Mini 3 was announced on October 16, 2014 and was released on October 22, 2014, alongside the iPad Air 2; it features the same external hardware as the Mini 2 and the addition of a Touch ID fingerprint sensor compatible with Apple Pay. On September 9, 2015, Apple released the iPad Mini 4; which is a smaller version of the iPad Air 2. On March 18, 2019, Apple released the fifth-generation iPad Mini with support for the Apple Pencil alongside the third-generation iPad Air. The sixth-generation iPad Mini was announced on September 14, 2021 alongside the ninth-generation iPad, with both devices being released on September 24, 2021. Matching the new design language of the current Pro and Air iPads, features included a larger 8.3-inch full-screen display, USB-C port (instead of Lightning), top button with Touch ID (with home button removed), and support for the second-generation Apple Pencil.

History 
On October 16, 2012, Apple announced plans for a media event on October 23 at the California Theatre in San Jose, California. The company did not give the subject of the event, but it was widely expected to be the iPad Mini. At the event, Apple CEO Tim Cook introduced a new version of MacBook family and new generations of the MacBook Pro, Mac Mini, and the iMac, then unveiled the fourth-generation iPad and the iPad Mini.

Features

Software 

The iPad Mini comes with several pre-installed applications, including Siri, Safari, Mail, Photos, Video, Music, iTunes, App Store, Maps, Notes, Calendar, Game Center, Photo Booth, and Contacts. Like all iOS devices, the iPad can sync content and other data with a Mac or PC using iTunes and to Apple's iCloud online service. Although the tablet is not designed to make telephone calls over a cellular network, users can use a headset or the built-in speaker and microphone and place phone calls over Wi-Fi or cellular using a VoIP application, such as Skype. iPads offer dictation when connected to a Wi-Fi or cellular network.

Applications from Apple and third-party developers can be downloaded through the App Store, an application distribution market for iOS that is maintained and regulated by Apple. The service allows users to browse and purchase  applications. Optional apps from Apple that can be purchased through the App Store include GarageBand, iMovie, iPhoto, and the iWork apps (Pages, Keynote, and Numbers) are available.

The device has an optional iBooks application, which displays books and other ePub-format content downloaded from the iBookstore. Several major book publishers including Penguin Books, HarperCollins, Simon & Schuster and Macmillan have committed to publishing books for the device. Despite the iPad being a direct competitor to both the Amazon Kindle and Barnes & Noble Nook, both Amazon.com and Barnes & Noble offer e-reader apps for the iPad.

On June 8, 2015, it was announced at the WWDC that all four generations of the iPad Mini would support iOS 9. However, certain new multitasking features, such as Slide Over and Picture in Picture, will be limited to the second, third, and fourth generation. Split View, another new multitasking feature, is available only on the iPad Mini 4.

The current version of iPadOS, iPadOS 16, is supported on iPad Mini 5 and up. The upgrade to this version is available as a free download.

The first-generation iPad Mini shipped with iOS 6.0 and the highest supported version is iOS 9.3.6 (for cellular models) or iOS 9.3.5 (for Wi-Fi models).

Hardware 

There are four buttons and one switch on the iPad Mini, including a "home" button near the display that returns the user to the home screen, and three aluminum buttons on the right side and top: wake/sleep and volume up and volume down, plus a software-controlled switch whose function varies with software updates. The tablet is manufactured either with or without the capability to communicate over a cellular network. All models can connect to a wireless LAN via Wi-Fi. The iPad Mini is available with 16, 32, 64 and 128 GB) of internal flash memory, with no expansion option. Apple sells a "camera connection kit" with an SD card reader, but it can be used only to transfer photos and videos.

The first-generation iPad Mini features partially the same hardware as the iPad 2. Both screens have resolutions of 1024 × 768, but the iPad Mini has a smaller screen and thus higher pixel density than iPad 2 (163 PPI vs. 132 PPI). Unlike the iPad 2, it has 5 MP and 1.2 MP cameras and the Lightning connector. The system-on-chip is A5, which is the same one found in the later revision of the iPad 2 (32 nm). The audio processor is the same found in iPhone 5 and iPad 4th generation, which allows the iPad Mini to have Siri and voice dictation unlike the iPad 2. The graphics processor (GPU) of the first-generation iPad Mini is the same one found in the iPad 2 (PowerVR SGX543MP2).

iPads with a data connection can download data through cellphone networks, but can not make voice calls. They can act as a hotspot, sharing the Internet connection over Wi-Fi, Bluetooth, or USB.

Accessories 

The Smart Cover, introduced with the iPad 2, is a screen protector that magnetically attaches to the face of the iPad. A smaller version is now available for iPad Mini. The cover has three folds, which allow it to convert into a stand, held together by magnets. Smart Covers have a microfiber bottom that cleans the front of the iPad, and wakes up the unit when the cover is removed. It comes in six colors of polyurethane.

Apple offers other accessories, including a Bluetooth keyboard, several types of earbuds or headphones and many adapters for the Lightning connector. AppleCare and free engraving are also available for the iPad Mini.

Model comparison 
The most recent model is the iPad Mini (6th generation). The iPad Mini models are listed in a comparison grid.

Support

Models

Models

Reception 

Reviews of the first generation iPad Mini have been positive, with reviewers praising the device's size, design, and availability of applications, while criticizing its use of a proprietary power connector and its lack of expandable storage and Retina Display for the first-generation iPad Mini. The device competes with tablets such as the Amazon Kindle Fire HD, Google Nexus 7, and Barnes & Noble Nook HD. Joshua Topolsky of The Verge praised the industrial design of the iPad Mini, however panned its lack of Retina Display and price. The iPad Mini 2 was well received, praising the Retina Display and Apple A7 chip performance, with criticisms on the price increase and the quality of the camera.

Timeline

See also 

 List of iOS devices
 Comparison of:
 E-book readers
 Tablet computers

Notes

References

External links 

  – official site

Mini
IOS
Tablet computers
Touchscreen portable media players
Tablet computers introduced in 2012

de:Apple iPad#iPad mini (erste Generation)